"Drum" (Original title: Tabl, ) is a 2016 Iranian feature film, written and directed by Iranian independent director Keywan Karimi.

The film depicts the story of a lawyer in Tehran City and is shot in black and white. Karimi has written the screenplay based on a book of the same name by Ali-Morad Fadaei-Nia.

The Drum was accepted in the competition section of the Critic's Week  of the 73rd Venice International Film Festival and will compete with the seven other films in this section for the Golden Lion  of the Venice Film Festival 2016.

Synopsis 
The atmosphere is dreamlike, the characters have no name, neither the streets. Teheran is the only character whose name is constantly evoked. A lawyer, as many others, works and lives alone in his apartment, which is both his office and his home. In a cold and rainy day, a man burst into his apartment, speaks to him shortly and confusingly and gives him a package that will completely change his life.

Music Production Credits 
Music production credits for The Drum include the works of Bamdad Afshar who worked on the film's music component as Sound Designer and Musician

Cast 
 Amirreza Naderi
 Sara Gholizade
 Ibrahim Zanjanian
 Elyas Rasouli
 Habib Honaramooz
 Ardalan Haji Rahim
 Ahmad Ghoorchi
 Ali Farschchi
 Mohammad Safajooee

See also 
 The official trailer of Drum for Venice International Film Festival
 Keywan Karimi
 Writing on The City

References 

2016 films
Iranian drama films